The Titanoecoidea or titanoecoids are a proposed taxon of araneomorph spiders at the superfamily rank. The taxon contains two families of spiders, Phyxelididae and Titanoecidae. Although some phylogenetic studies have shown these two families to form a clade, other studies have not, placing Titanoecidae outside the RTA clade while Phyxelididae is placed inside it. A 2011 classification of spider families leaves both Phyxelididae and Titanoecidae outside the RTA clade as "unplaced non-Orbiculariae families". The status of the group remains unclear .

References

Araneomorphae
Arachnid superfamilies